Alla Arkadievna Sosnitskaya (born 10 April 1997) is a Russian artistic gymnast. She won team bronze medals at the 2014 World and European Championships.

Career 
Sosnitskaya is coached by Marina Ulyankina, who also coaches fellow national team members Maria Paseka and Viktoria Kuzmina. Her best events are vault and floor exercise.

Junior 
Sosnitskaya competed at the Russian Championships in 2012, placing eighth on floor exercise.

Senior 
Sosnitskaya made her senior debut at the Russian Championships in 2013, where she won silver with her team. She went on to make her international debut at the Anadia World Cup, where she placed eighth on vault. At the Russian Cup in August, she won gold on floor exercise, silver in the all-around, bronze on vault and uneven bars, and placed fourth with her team and on balance beam. At the Osijek World Cup in September, she placed fourth on vault and bars. 

In late October, Sosnitskaya was named to the Russian team for the Élite Gym Massilia in November. In the Master Team division, the Russian team placed second in the all-around, bars, and beam, and fourth on vault and floor. Individually, she placed fourth on floor, sixth on vault, and nineteenth in the all-around. She qualified to the Top Massilia, placing fourth on floor and winning gold on vault. She went on to compete at the Brasilia Gymnasiade, winning gold with her team and in the all-around, silver on vault, and placing fifth on bars and eighth on floor.

Sosnitskaya competed at the 2014 European Championships in Sofia, Bulgaria. In qualifications she scored 14.566 on vault and 14.133 on floor. She qualified in 6th place to the vault final and 7th place to the floor final. In the team final she contributed scores of 14.733 on vault and 13.766 on floor towards the Russian team's bronze medal finish.

Competitive history

References
Russian Gymnastics Profile

1997 births
Living people
Russian female artistic gymnasts
Gymnasts from Moscow

Medalists at the World Artistic Gymnastics Championships
21st-century Russian women